Matthew Huxley (19 April 1920 – 10 February 2005) was an epidemiologist and anthropologist, as well as an educator and author. His work ranged from promoting universal health care to establishing standards of care for nursing home patients and the mentally ill to investigating the question of what is a socially sanctionable drug.

Background
Huxley was born in London as the son of British author Aldous Huxley and his Belgian wife Maria Nijs. He was educated at Dartington Hall School.

Resettling in the United States with his father in 1937, Huxley attended the Fountain Valley School of Colorado and graduated from the University of California at Berkeley. He received a master's degree in public health from Harvard University. He worked for the Milbank Memorial Fund, a New York-based foundation, and from 1963 to 1983, with a brief intermission, worked at the National Institute of Mental Health in Washington. In 1968, he briefly served as director of seminars at the Smithsonian Institution.

In April 1950 Huxley married Ellen Hovde, a documentary filmmaker. The couple had two children, Trevenen Huxley (b. 20 October 1951) and Tessa Huxley (b. October 1953), and divorced in 1961. On 22 March 1963 he wed Judith Wallet Bordage, a freelance writer and food columnist at the Washington Post; she died in 1983. He then married Franziska Reed in 1986, who survived him.

Huxley died of cardiac shock in  Reading, Pennsylvania, in February 2005 at the age of 84.

Publications

References

Matthew
1920 births
2005 deaths
Harvard School of Public Health alumni
People educated at Dartington Hall School
University of California, Berkeley alumni
British emigrants to the United States